James Roe Ketchum (born 15 March 1939) served as White House Curator from 1963 to 1970, appointed by President John F. Kennedy and continuing his position under presidents Lyndon B. Johnson and Richard Nixon. In this position, he served as both the head of the White House Office of the Curator and as a spokesperson for the office's initiatives.

White House
Ketchum was appointed as White House Curator in 1963, just months before the assassination of John F. Kennedy on November 22, 1963.

Ketchum recounted in a 2010 interview that the day of the assassination remained his most vivid memory of his time at the White House. After watching news coverage of the assassination, Ketchum received instructions from Jackie Kennedy, by then the former first lady, who advised that the president's body would lie in repose in the East Room and requested that it be decorated just as it had been for President Abraham Lincoln, who was the victim of an assassination attempt on April 14, 1865 and died the following day. Ketchum and his team consulted books and other documents in search of any information about the East Room's appearance during the mourning period for Lincoln. Ketchum and his team were draping the East Room's windows and chandeliers in black at 2 a.m. when Jackie Kennedy returned to the White House. Ketchum did not return to his home in Arlington, Virginia until November 24, having worked more than 48 hours.

See also
 White House Office of the Curator

External links

References

Living people
21st-century American historians
21st-century American male writers
White House Curators
Nixon administration personnel
Lyndon B. Johnson administration personnel
Kennedy administration personnel
American male non-fiction writers
1939 births